Ricardo Nuno Queirós Nascimento (born 19 April 1974) is a Portuguese retired footballer who played as an attacking midfielder.

He amassed Primeira Liga totals of 102 matches and 11 goals over seven seasons, in representation of Boavista, Varzim, Gil Vicente, Braga and Rio Ave. He added 182 matches and 34 goals in the Segunda Liga, and also spent two years in South Korea.

Club career
Born in Vila Nova de Gaia, Porto District, Nascimento started his professional career with Leixões SC, competing with the club in the second division. He went on to make 283 league appearances for a host of teams in his country, including Boavista FC, Varzim SC, Gil Vicente F.C. and S.C. Braga; prior to the two latter sides, in 2000–01, he had his first abroad experience, with Montpellier HSC: the French promoted from Ligue 2, but the player only played seven matches in the entire campaign.

Nascimento had an Asian adventure from February 2005, appearing for South Korea's FC Seoul which he joined on a free transfer from Rio Ave FC. In January 2008 he returned to Portugal, contributing with 14 games to C.D. Trofense's first ever promotion to the Primeira Liga.

After leaving Trofense in November 2008, Nascimento signed for C.D. Aves for a third spell, moving to the second level team until the end of the campaign. He stated: «I'm back to the club of my heart» upon his arrival, and left in June 2010 at the age of 36, being rarely used during his final spell and retiring shortly afterwards.

Honours

Club
FC Seoul
Korean League Cup: 2006; Runner-up 2007

Trofense
Segunda Liga: 2007–08

Individual
Top Assists Award: 2005

References

External links

1974 births
Living people
Sportspeople from Vila Nova de Gaia
Portuguese footballers
Association football midfielders
Primeira Liga players
Liga Portugal 2 players
Leixões S.C. players
Boavista F.C. players
C.D. Aves players
Varzim S.C. players
Gil Vicente F.C. players
S.C. Braga players
S.C. Salgueiros players
F.C. Maia players
Rio Ave F.C. players
C.D. Trofense players
CD Candal players
Ligue 2 players
Montpellier HSC players
K League 1 players
FC Seoul players
Portugal youth international footballers
Portugal under-21 international footballers
Portuguese expatriate footballers
Expatriate footballers in France
Expatriate footballers in South Korea
Portuguese expatriate sportspeople in France
Portuguese expatriate sportspeople in South Korea